United Nations Security Council Resolution 347, adopted on April 24, 1974, concerned that a recent outbreak of violence by Israel would bring war to the Middle East, the Council condemned Israel's violation of Lebanon's territorial integrity and again called upon Israel to refrain from further military action against Lebanon.  The Resolution goes on to condemn the loss of civilian life and called upon Israel to respect international law and return to Lebanon the civilians it had kidnapped.

The resolution was adopted by 13 votes to none, while two members, Iraq and the People's Republic of China, did not participate in the voting.

See also
 Israeli–Lebanese conflict
 List of United Nations Security Council Resolutions 301 to 400 (1971–1976)

References 
Text of the Resolution at undocs.org

External links
 

 0347
 0347
 0347
April 1974 events